Lyneham is a village and civil parish about  southwest of Chipping Norton, Oxfordshire. It is bounded to the southwest by the River Evenlode, to the southeast by the A361 road linking Chipping Norton and Burford, and on other sides by field boundaries. The 2011 Census recorded the parish's population as 153.

History
It was excavated in 1956. About 250 yards southwest of the hill fort is Lyneham Longbarrow, which was excavated in 1894. The barrow is of Cotswold-Severn type and contains two chambers. North-west of the barrow is a standing stone that it is believed was originally part of the barrow.

Lyneham was a chapelry of the Church of England parish of St Mary, Shipton-under-Wychwood until 1895. It was then transferred to the parish of St Simon and Jude, Milton-under-Wychwood. The church of St Michael and All Angels was built in Lyneham in 1907. It was a timber-framed building with a corrugated iron exterior, colloquially called a "tin tabernacle". It ceased to be used for worship early in the 1970s and was demolished in 1975.

In the 19th century the Oxford, Worcester and Wolverhampton Railway was built through the south of the parish along the Evenlode valley. The line was authorised in 1845 and completed in 1853. This part of the OW&W Railway is now the Cotswold Line.

References

Sources and further reading

External links

Civil parishes in Oxfordshire
Villages in Oxfordshire
West Oxfordshire District